"My Arms Keep Missing You" is a song by Rick Astley released in 1987 as the second half of a double A-side single. The first A-side is the pop standard "When I Fall in Love". "My Arms Keep Missing You" was released as an independent single in Germany and reached number 6. The song's first appearance on an album was the 2002 compilation Greatest Hits, and it later appeared on the 2010 expanded version of Hold Me in Your Arms as a bonus track. The track is also slated to appear on the upcoming remastered edition of Whenever You Need Somebody, which is due for release on 20 May 2022. In addition, a digital EP was released on 13 April 2022, including the single and its remixes.

Track listing
12" vinyl promo RCA RICK 1000 DJ

 "My Arms Keep Missing You"
 "My Arms Keep Missing You" 

12" vinyl RCA PT 41684 R

 "My Arms Keep Missing You"  – 6:11
 "My Arms Keep Missing You" – 6:45
 "When I Fall in Love" – 2:59 

My Arms Keep Missing You - EP
 "My Arms Keep Missing You" – 3:14
 "My Arms Keep Missing You" (The Where's Harry? Remix) – 3:15
 "My Arms Keep Missing You" (Bruno's Remix) – 6:17
 "My Arms Keep Missing You" (No L Mix) – 6:46

Charts

Weekly charts

References

1987 singles
Rick Astley songs
Songs written by Mike Stock (musician)
Songs written by Matt Aitken
Songs written by Pete Waterman
Song recordings produced by Stock Aitken Waterman
1987 songs
RCA Records singles